The South East Coastal Plain is an interim Australian bioregion located in coastal southern Victoria. The South East Coastal Plain bioregion is part of the Southeast Australia temperate forests ecoregion and also features the Gippsland Plains Grassy Woodland.

Subregions
The Southern Plains bioregion consists of three subregions:

 Gippsland Plain (SCP01) – 
 Otway Plain (SCP02) – 
 Warrnambool Plain (SCP03) –

References

Biogeography of Victoria (Australia)
IBRA regions
Southeast Australia temperate forests